Pond Creek Township is an inactive township in Greene County, in the U.S. state of Missouri.

Pond Creek Township took its name from Pond Creek.

References

Townships in Missouri
Townships in Greene County, Missouri